Aurora is a planned supercomputer to be completed in 2023. It will be the United States' second exascale computer after the AMD-powered Frontier-supercomputer. It is sponsored by the United States Department of Energy (DOE) and designed by Intel and Cray for the Argonne National Laboratory. It will have  2 exaFLOPS in computing power which is approximately a quintillion (260 or 1018) calculations per second and will have an expected cost of US$500 million. It will follow Frontier, which was the world's first exascale supercomputer in 2022.

History 
In 2013 DOE presented their exascale vision of one exaFLOP at 20 MW by 2020. Aurora was first announced in 2015 and to be finished in 2018. It was expected to have a speed of 180 petaFLOPS which would be around the speed of Summit. Aurora was meant to be the most powerful supercomputer at the time of its launch and to be built by Cray with Intel processors. Later, in 2017, Intel announced that Aurora would be delayed to 2021 but scaled up to 1 exaFLOP. In March 2019, DOE said that it would build the first supercomputer with a performance of one exaFLOP in the United States in 2021. In October 2020, DOE said that Aurora would be delayed again for a further 6 months and would no longer be the first exascale computer in the US. In late October 2021 Intel announced Aurora would now exceed 2 exaFLOPS in peak double-precision compute.

Planned usage 

Planned functions include research on nuclear fusion, low carbon technologies,  subatomic particles, cancer and cosmology. It will also develop new materials that will be useful for batteries and more efficient solar cells. It is to be available to the general scientific community.

Architecture  

Aurora will have over nine thousand nodes, with each node being composed of two Intel Xeon Sapphire Rapids processors, six Xe GPU's and a unified memory architecture which will make a single node have a maximum computing power of 130 teraFLOPS. It will have around 10 petabytes of memory and 230 PB of storage.

The machine is estimated to consume around 60 MW. For comparison, the fastest computer in the world today, Frontier uses 21 MW while Summit uses 13 MW.

See also 
 ARM supercomputers
 Frontier (supercomputer)
 Fugaku (supercomputer)
 List of fastest computers
 Summit (supercomputer)
 TOP500

References 

Supercomputers
Intel products
Cray products
United States Department of Energy
Exascale computers